Gregory v. Hartley, 113 U.S. 742 (1885), was a case in error to the Supreme Court of the State of Nebraska where it was decided and reaffirmed that the words "term at which said cause could be first tried and before the trial thereof," Act of March 3, 1875, c. 137, § 3, 18 Stat. 471, mean the first term at which the cause is in law triable, i.e., in which it would stand for trial if the parties had taken the usual steps as to pleadings and other preparations. Babbitt v. Clark, 103 U.S. 808, and Pullman Palace Car Co. v. Speck, ante, 113 U.S. 87.

Decision
Chief Justice Waite delivered the opinion of the Court.

Without considering any of the other objections to the removal which might be urged, the judgment was Affirmed.

See also
List of United States Supreme Court cases, volume 113

References

External links
 

United States federal jurisdiction case law
United States Supreme Court cases
United States Supreme Court cases of the Waite Court
History of Lincoln, Nebraska
1885 in United States case law